Río Cruces Chorocamayo Nature Sanctuary (Spanish: Santuario de la naturaleza Carlos Anwandter) is protected wetland in Cruces River about  north of Valdivia, Chile. The sanctuary is named after the German politician Carlos Anwandter who settled in Valdivia during the 1850s. The wetlands in the sanctuary are inhabited by many bird species including Black-necked Swans. This sanctuary provides a home for many native waterbird species to flourish, and contains roughly 119 species of birds alone. Despite being a nature sanctuary for the country of Chile under the National Monuments Act, it wasn't internationally recognized for its cultural and natural value until the Ramsar Wetlands Convention of 1971.

Pollution controversy
The conservation effort promoted collaboration between Chile (CONAF) and Mexico (CONANP) for protecting the wetlands. The River Cruces and Chorocamayo Nature Sanctuary Management Plan was instated in 2016 by CONAF with financing help from the Ramsar Convention.

In 2004, the Valdivia Pulp Mill was opened in San José de la Mariquina located 25 km (16 mi) northeast of the preserve near the Cruces River. The emblematic Black-necked Swans started at that time to die and migrate.

In 2004 ecologists and people from the university UACH in Valdivia accused the forestry enterprise CELCO of polluting the river. Swan autopsies revealed that their deaths were due to high levels of iron and dangerous metals in the water. The pulp mill was forced to close while the case was investigated. Even in 2006, the Latin American water tribunal recommended closing down the mill.

As of November 2008, the case against CELCO was still being debated in court. In the meantime, other hypotheses have been proposed to explain the dramatic decrease of the swan's population.

See also 

Área Costera Protegida Punta Curiñanco
Oncol Park
Punucapa
Urban Wetlands Law

References

Source X; https://www.conaf.cl/?s=carlos+anwandter

Protected areas of Los Ríos Region
Ramsar sites in Chile
National reserves of Chile
Urban wetlands of Chile
Birdwatching sites in Chile